This is a list of Arkansas Civil War Confederate Units, or military units from the state of Arkansas which fought for the Confederacy in the American Civil War. The list of Union units is shown separately.

Like most states, Arkansas possessed a prewar Militia organization, which consisted of seventy one regiments, organized into eight brigades, and divided into two divisions. In addition to its standard militia regiment or regiments, each county was authorized to create up to four Volunteer Militia Companies. While none of the prewar militia regiments were enrolled into Confederate service, many of the existing Volunteer Militia Companies were enrolled into new volunteer regiments. Other new Volunteer Companies were raised with no connection to the prewar militia. Immediately following secession, the State Military Board began organizing regiments of State Troops. Many of these regiments were eventually transferred into Confederate Service.  Some Volunteer Regiments were organized under direct authority of the new Confederate Government and were never organized as State Troops. In April 1862, the Confederate Congress passed a conscription law and new companies and regiments were organized almost entirely of conscripted (drafted) men. 
Volunteers usually went into already existing units. The secession convention also authorized each county to organize Home Guard units made up of men too young or too old or otherwise exempt from conscription or militia service.

Militia

At the beginning of the war, the Arkansas Militia consisted of 71 Regiments, which were organized into two divisions, each division made up of four brigades. Every county had at least one regiment, and several had more than one. The Arkansas Militia Act allowed each regiment to form up to four volunteer companies. While the regular militia regiments were required to drill three times per year and were required to supply their own weapons, the volunteer companies drilled much more often and were supplied with equipment by the state.

Only one Militia Regiment, the 45th Arkansas Militia Regiment of Searcy County, was mobilized for service during the war. In the fall of 1861, Governor Rector called up the 45th Militia Regiment to deal with a potential threat to the Confederate government from the anti-war "peace societies". The militiamen arrested suspects in the Ozark Mountains of northwest Arkansas, and many of them were forced to enlist in Marmaduke's 18th Arkansas Infantry Regiment.

Governor Rector ordered Colonel Solon F. Borland to form a provisional battalion of militia  in Pulaski County in April 1862 for the purpose of seizing the federal installation at Fort Smith,  Borland's Arkansas Infantry Battalion consisted of three volunteer infantry companies and a volunteer artillery battery from the 13th Arkansas Militia Regiment.  Borland's Battalion marched on Fort Smith, only to discover the military post had been abandoned by Federal Troops the day before. One company remained to guard the post, and the rest returned to Pulaski County, where they became part of volunteer regiments.

A decision was made by the state Arkansas Secession Convention not to activate the militia in mass, but form a series of new State Troop regiments for the new Army of Arkansas.  Many of these volunteer militia companies were enrolled in the new volunteer regiments which were formed by the Military Board of Arkansas.

State Troops

Provisional Army of Arkansas

The Arkansas Succession Convention decided that rather than activating the existing militia regiments, they would raise new volunteer regiments.  The convention was concerned that if the militia was called out and transferred into Confederate Service, they would be subject to being transferred out of the state, leaving the state defenseless.  The convention was also concerned with the cost involved in paying for a large standing state force.  These new volunteer regiments would be a part of the Provisional Army of Arkansas and would be transitioned into Confederate service as quickly as possible.  The Provisional Army of Arkansas was to consist of two divisions, the 1st Division in the western part of the state, and the 2nd Division in the eastern part of the state.  The new regiments of State Troops were mustered into service for 90 days.  The regiments in the eastern division were transferred into Confederate Service under the command of Brigadier General Hardee.  The regiments in the western division participated in the Battle of Wilson's Creek as a brigade under State Brigadier General N.B. Pearce. Following the battle of Wilson's Creek, the western division was marched back to Arkansas and given the opportunity to vote on whether or not they would be transferred into Confederate Service.  The units of the western division voted to disband rather than transfer into Confederate service.  The Secession Convention appointed a new state military board to organize the new regiments and coordinate their transition into Confederate service.

Left to its own defenses
In the Spring of 1862, the state again attempted to gather its own force of State Troops.  General Van Dorn had been ordered to take his Army of the West, east of the Mississippi River in order to support Confederate efforts in western Tennessee that would ultimately lead to the Battle of Shiloh and the Corinth Campaign.  The State Military Board authorized the establishment of several new regiments for the defense of the State, and ordered the conscription of the requisite number of men from the militia to fill the ranks. The new regiments were organized fairly quickly, and were mustered into service in June, July and August 1862.  They were mustered into service as the 1st (Rector), 2nd (Brooks) and 3rd (Peel) Regiments, Northwest Division, District of Arkansas. Colonel Peel was eventually superseded by Charles W. Adams, resulting in what is known as 3rd Regiment, Arkansas State Troops (Adams'), which, was disbanded after breaking under fire during the Battle of Prairie Grove.  The 1st and 2nd Regiments, Northwest Division, finally assumed their authorized designations of 35th (Rector) and 34th (Brooks) Arkansas Regiments, respectively.

The last-ditch recruiting effort
Following the fall of Little Rock to Union Forces in September 1863, the State of Arkansas was again forced to raise units of State Troops in order to provide for its own defense. Governor Harris Flanagin (who had defeated Governor Rector in his re-election bid of 1862) issued a proclamation on August 10, 1863, just a month before the capitol fell, announcing that he had been authorized to raise new regiments of state troops and that by special agreement these new units could not be transferred out of the state by Confederate authorities.  After the fall of Little Rock, recruiting was far more difficult than it had been in the first years of the war. The constant transfer of Arkansas troops into the eastern theater of the war, across the Mississippi River from their homes, was a major objection by the remaining population of men eligible for military service. With Federal forces now occupying the state capitol, the Confederate state government had no way of enforcing conscription laws in the counties behind the Union lines, except during raids by Generals Price and Shelby in 1864. The remaining Confederate regiments were plagued by desertions.

On September 16, 1863, Governor Fagan issued General Order No. 6 from Arkadelphia, which called into service the militia regiments of the counties of Clark, Hempstead, Sevier, Pike, Polk, Montgomery, La Fayette, Ouachita, Union, and Columbia in order to resist the Federal army. The Governor's order directed the regiments to march to Arkadelphia at the earliest possible day. Companies were to be mounted and commanders were to compel persons evading the call to come to the rendezvous. The intent was to form companies of twelve-month mounted volunteers.  In describing this call in a letter to General Holmes dated October 18, 1863 from Washington, Arkansas, the new Confederate state capitol, Flanagin stated that he issued the order calling out the militia, as an experiment, expecting to get volunteers. The order succeeded in getting companies organized in the counties where the call for the militia was enforced which resulted in seven companies being collected under the call.  Flanagin also stated that "the troops raised by the State are more than double all the troops raised by volunteering, or by the conscript law, within the past few months".

These new units of Arkansas State Troops were placed under the overall command of Col. William H. Trader who was detailed to Governor Flanagin by General E. Kirby Smith. Col. Trader remained in command of the state troops until he resigned in June 1864.

On January 14, 1864, Governor Flanagin, through General Peay, issued General Orders, No. 8. which directed that certain named companies of Arkansas mounted volunteers, which had been called into the service of the State under the proclamation of the August 10, 1863, be designated as the 1st Battalion, Arkansas State Troops, more often referred to as Pettus's Battalion Arkansas State Troops. The unit participated in the battle of Marks Mill on April 25, 1864, as a part of Brigadier General William L. Cabell's Brigade. Lieutenant Colonel Pettus was killed during the battle and Captain P.K. Williamson of Company A commanded the battalion until the unit was increased to a regiment and transferred to Confederate service.

In August 1864 when the term of enlistment for these state troops was about to expire, Adjutant General Peay issued an order which directed that companies be allowed to vote on the subject of being transferred into Confederate service. On September 5, 1864, the State Troop companies, including Pettus's Battalion, were formed into one regiment of cavalry to be designated as the 3rd Regiment of Arkansas State Cavalry, with Col. Robert C. Newton assigned to the command of the regiment until an election could be held for field officers. This unit was mustered into the Confederate Service on the October 31, 1864  as the 10th Arkansas Cavalry Regiment (Newton's), and Col. Newton was elected regimental commander.

List of Arkansas State Troop units

Confederate Forces raised in Arkansas

Infantry
Tracking Arkansas Confederate infantry regiments can be extremely complicated due to the fact that numerical designations were often issued to multiple units.  Some of these duplications were due to the competing authorities attempting to organize forces in the state.  Other duplications were due to poor and or delayed communications between the various mustering agents, the Arkansas State Military Board, which was in charge of organizing forces within the state, and the Confederate War Department in Richmond. Additional duplications occurred when parts of various regiments were captured, only to be paroled, exchanged and returned to active status at some later point.  Finally, much duplication occurred after effective communications had been severed between Richmond and the Department of the Trans-Mississippi.  at one point, General Hindman began designating new units organized in Arkansas as Trans-Mississippi Rifle Regiments, which resulted in many regiments serving west of the Mississippi having duplicate designations with units serving east of the Mississippi River.

Competing Authorities
An example of the confusion caused by the competing authorities organizing forces is the numbers of the regiment organized by Colonel, later Major General, Patrick Cleburne.  Cleburne's regiment received the designation of 1st Arkansas when it was mustered into state service at Mound City on May 14, 1861.  Cleburne's regiment was accepted into Confederate service by General Hardee on July 23, 1861, at Pitman's Ferry, Arkansas as the 1st Arkansas Volunteer Infantry.  However Confederate authorities had authorized Colonel T. B. Flournoy to raise a regiment of Arkansas Volunteers in April 1861, before the state had actually seceded.  The regiment raised by Flournoy, which elected James F. Fagan as its original colonel, was never mustered into State Service, so it never received a state designation.  When Cleburne's regiment's documents reached the war department, the duplication was discovered and Cleburne's regiment was re-designated as the 15th Arkansas. Unfortunately there would be two other regiments which were also numbered the 15th Arkansas, one commanded by Colonel Dandrige McRea and another commanded by Colonel James Gee.

Additionally, at various times during the war, the State Military Board attempted to organized State Troop organizations, which were not intended to be transferred to Confederate Service.  Most of these regiments were eventually transferred into Confederate service but they existed, often with duplicated state number designations for some period of time as state organizations. An example of this confusion involves the 3rd Arkansas Infantry Regiment and Adams Arkansas Infantry Regiment. After the battle of Pea Ridge, General Van Dorn took most of the organized regiments in the state, and all military supplies that he could lay hand on and moved them across the Mississippi River to Corinth, Mississippi, leaving the state basically defenseless. The State Military Board authorized the establishment of several new regiments for the defense of the State, and ordered the conscription of the requisite number of men from the militia to fill the ranks. The new regiments were organized fairly quickly, and were mustered into service in June, July and August 1862. Among the newly organized regiments authorized by the State Military Board were the 34th (Col. William H. Brooks), 35th (Col. Frank A. Rector) and 36th (Col. Samuel W. Peel). True to form, these designations were ignored, and they were mustered into service as the 1st (Rector), 2nd (Brooks) and 3rd (Peel) Regiments, Northwest Division, District of Arkansas. Colonel Peel was eventually superseded by Charles W. Adams, resulting in what is known as Adam's 3rd Arkansas Infantry, which, was disbanded after the Battle of Prairie Grove.  The 1st and 2nd Regiments, Northwest Division, finally assumed their authorized designations of 35th and 34th Arkansas Regiments, respectively. To further confuse matters, when the United States War Department clerks who put together the Compiled Service Records, decades after the war, ran across scattered records of certain men of the 3rd Arkansas who had been paroled at Springfield, Missouri, after the battle of Prairie Grove, they compiled them with the records of Colonel Van H. Manning's 3rd Arkansas Volunteer Infantry Regiment. In fact, these men belonged to Adams's so-called 3rd Arkansas.

Confusing Communications
Communications with the Confederate War Department also led to much confusion.  When a new regiment was organized, state officials issued the next available number under its numbering scheme. Before a new unit obtained its final or Confederate designation, the regimental muster rolls and election returns had to be forwarded to the Confederate War Department which would assign the next available number, according to its numbering scheme. Given the great distance involved, even before Union forces established effective control of the Mississippi River, many duplications occurred.  When a duplication was identified, the Confederate War Department would attempt to renumber a regiment to relieve the confusion, but often only confused the issue further.  A good example of this type of duplication is the regiment organized by Dandridge McRea.  McRea's unit was originally designated as the 3rd Arkansas Infantry Battalion, because it lacked the required number of companies to organize as a full regiment.  By the time sufficient companies were added to bring the unit up to regimental strength, the unit was designated as the 21st Arkansas Infantry Regiment.  However, Confederate authorities realized that they had also accepted Colonel Jordan E. Cravens regiment as the 21st Arkansas.  To rectify the confusion, the Confederate War Department redesignated McRea's Regiment as the 15th Arkansas Infantry.  Almost immediately, the Confederate War Department realized that it had just awarded this designation to Cleburne's former 1st Arkansas, so McRea's Regiment was redesignated as the 15th (Northwest) Arkansas Infantry Regiment.

Designations affected by surrender, parole and exchange
The designations of some units became conflicted as parts of units were captured and later paroled, exchanged, and re-entered active service.  An example of this is Dawson's 19th Arkansas Infantry.  The regiment completed its organization at Nashville, Arkansas, in November 1861 and Charles L. Dawson was elected colonel.  The unit was assigned to the garrison of Fort Hindman at Arkansas Post, where a large part of the regiment was captured when the fort was surrendered on January 11, 1863. Some of the men, including the regimental commander, Colonel Dawson, were absent from Arkansas Post at the time it surrendered.  This remnant of the 19th was consolidated with similar remnants of other units captured at the post, and with Colonel Dawson, in command, they were referred to as the 19th/24th Consolidated Arkansas, sometimes being referred to as Hardy's Regiment (who succeeded Dawson in command), and operated in the Trans-Mississippi department for the remainder of the war. The part of Dawson's original regiment that was captured at Arkansas Post, were sent to prisons in the North, and when exchanged in April 1863 at City Point, Virginia, and then transferred to the Army of Tennessee, where they spent the rest of the war, also being referred to as the 19th Arkansas. There was also a third regiment that was given the designation of 19th Arkansas. This regiment was organized on April 2, 1862, at DeValls Bluff, with Col. Hamilton P. Smead in command.  Smead was eventually replaced by Colonel Thomas P. Dockery, and surrendered with the garrison of Vicksburg Mississippi.

Re-organization of the Trans-Mississippi Department
In May 1862, Major General Hindman assumed command of the Trans-Mississippi and found that the state had been stripped of organized Confederate forces when Major General Van Dorn moved his Army of the West, east of the Mississippi River.  In order to organize a new Confederate Army in Arkansas, Hindman utilized the Confederate Conscription act of April 1862.  This act actually specifically forbid the use of conscription to raise to units.  It had been intended to create a pool of replacements for the regiments which were already in Confederate service but had been depleted by disease and battle filed losses.  With no organized regiments in Arkansas, Hindman was forced to create new units.  He designated several of his new units as Trans-Mississippi Rifle Regiments. Col. Asa S. Morgan's 26th Arkansas Regiment was designated as the 3rd Trans-Mississippi Regiment. Immediately the officers and men begin to refer to themselves as the 3rd Arkansas Regiment. This leads to confusion for researchers who find Col. Van H. Manning's 3rd Arkansas Volunteer Infantry serving under General Lee in the Army of Northern Virginia and a group in Arkansas who insist on also calling themselves the 3rd Arkansas.  General Hindman's reason for the use of this designation isn't clear.  It may have been a way of emphasizing that these units were for use west of the Mississippi River in the new Department of the Trans-Mississippi, or it may be related to his dispute with Governor Rector over Rector's plan to raise new regiments of State Troops instead of enrolling new units in Confederate service.  It may also have to do with the fact that several of these new units at least initially contained companies of men from Missouri and Texas who were in Arkansas when the organization began.

Consolidated units
As Confederate units lost access to the geographical area's that they were organized in, they lost any ability to recruit replacements for their battlefield and non battlefield losses. This was particularly true of the regiments that found themselves isolated east of the Mississippi River after the fall of Vicksburg in 1863.  As the regiments continued to dwindle in size, it became necessary to combine or consolidate units in order to eliminate unnecessary, redundant command and staff positions and field units at or near full strength.  Most of these consolidations were considered "field consolidations" which were intended to be temporary organizations, until recruits could be obtained.  Attempts were made to maintain the separate identity of the original regiments in these temporary or field consolidations. Later as the manpower shortage became more extreme, it became necessary to make these consolidations permanent.  In the Department of the Trans-Mississippi, these permanent consolidations began in 1864, resulting in the 1st, 2nd and 3rd Arkansas Consolidated Infantry Regiments.  In the Army of Tennessee these permanent consolidations did not occur until the final month of the war, resulting in the 1st Consolidated Arkansas Infantry and the 1st Consolidated Arkansas Mounted Rifles.

The 40 Series Regiments
The State Military Board assigned designators in the 40-series all the way up to the 48th Arkansas. The 40-series Arkansas infantry regiments are actually listed as cavalry regiments in most histories. The first four (40th, 41st, 42nd, 43rd) were assigned to the Arkansas regiments that were surrendered at the Sieges of Vicksburg and Port Hudson, when these regiments were reorganized in southern Arkansas following their parole and exchange. The 41st was assigned to the exchanged prisoners of the 20th Arkansas Infantry Regiment, the 42nd was assigned to the survivors of the 23rd Arkansas Infantry. The 40th and 43rd were assigned to either 15th (Northwest) or the 19th (Dockery's) Arkansas, but it is impossible to be sure which was which because of the illegibility of the original documents.  All of these were assigned as mounted infantry designations, and all of them were ignored by the Confederate Army because the old designations continued to be used in the reports for their commanders. There are occasionally prisoner of war records that utilize the official designations.

The 44th through the 48th Arkansas infantry regiments were raised in the summer of 1864, were mounted in order to accompany Price's 1864 Missouri Expedition, which was planned as an all-cavalry affair.  Rare references list them as mounted infantry, for example, 44th Arkansas Infantry (Mounted). However, they were almost always referred to as Cavalry units (for example 44th Arkansas Cavalry) when the numerical designation was used. Usually, however, they were simply designated by the name of the regiment's colonel, for example, McGehee's Arkansas Cavalry. These regiments were for the most part raised in northeast Arkansas, and seem to have consisted in large part of absentees from other regiments. The 45th Arkansas, for example, consisted largely of absentees from the 7th Arkansas and the 38th Arkansas Regiments.

List of Arkansas Confederate Regiments

Infantry Battalions
Infantry battalions were not intended to be standing organizations during the Civil War.  The regiment was the standard organization for both the Union and Confederate Armies.  Battalions most often came into existence when there were not enough infantry companies present to form a full regiment, as when Dandrige McRea's 3rd Arkansas Infantry Battalion was formed before the battle of Wilson's Creek.  Many of these ad hoc organizations, like McRea's, eventually gained enough companies and received recognition as a full regiment.  Some battalions were formed by the detachment of several companies from a parent regiment as when several companies were detached from McCraven's 14th Arkansas Infantry and transferred to Kentucky with Brigadier General Hardee in 1861, and were designated the 9th Arkansas Infantry Battalion.  A few battalions, like the 12th Arkansas Infantry Battalion, actually saw significant combat as a separate command.

Volunteer Companies
The basic building block of a regiment during the Civil War period was the volunteer company. Many volunteer militia companies were organized under the authority of the Arkansas militia law during 1860 and 1861. Most of the companies raised during this period had their elections certified by the local militia regimental commander and their commissions were issued by the governor as the commander in chief of the State Militia. This practice continued until the fall of 1861. Other volunteer companies were raised directly for Confederate service and were never organized in the state militia. Volunteer companies, whether militia or raised directly for Confederate service were then organized into new volunteer regiments. A regiment required eight to ten  companies for organization. If a unit was not able to  field enough companies to organize as a regiment, it was often allowed to organize as a separate battalion until enough companies were added to comprise a full regiment. A separate battalion was commanded by a lieutenant colonel. This list includes only those companies with a distinct name. Many volunteer companies were simply designated "Volunteer Infantry Company, Conway County," or Volunteer Cavalry Company, Conway County".

Cavalry
Arkansas mounted units consisted of three types, Cavalry, Mounted Infantry, and Partisan Rangers.  Cavalry forces fought principally on horseback, armed with carbines, pistols, and especially sabers.  Only a small percentage of Arkansas mounted forces met this definition. Some Arkansas Confederate regiments carried shotguns, especially early in the war.  Due to a lack of appropriate weapons and training in actual cavalry tactics, most Arkansas horsesoldiers were actually Mounted Infantry.  Mounted Infantry moved on horseback but dismounted for fighting on foot, armed principally with rifles.  In the second half of the war, most of the units considered to be cavalry actually fought battles using the tactics of mounted infantry. Irregular forces (partisan rangers or guerrillas) were generally mounted forces. There is little commonality as to their weapons—in general, any available were used.

While the concept of a mounted infantry force able to move quickly from point to point and fight as infantry seemed appealing, especially to new recruits, it proved to come at significant costs.  Logistically a mounted force was much more costly to sustain and the units themselves tended to be less effective in the actual war effort than standard infantry formations.

Due to severe drought in Arkansas in 1862 and 1863, forage for horses became increasing scares and led to calls from multiple Confederate commanders to dismount the mounted units.  Multiple Confederate commanders lamented the fact that the country had been "eaten out" by cavalry.  General Hindman at one point stated:

Mounted infantry, while theoretically more maneuverable, were in practice less disciplined and less reliable than the standard infantry formation. Confederate commanders, especially in the Department of the Trans-Mississippi regularly bemoaned the fact that most recruits wanted to "jine the cavalry" as opposed to infantry.  Confederate commanders often suggested dismounting cavalry and mounted infantry units in order to man infantry units and this happened to several Arkansas units that served in the Army of Tennessee.

The continued organization of more and more mounted units, and the retention of so many others, in the Department of the Trans-Mississippi seem to defy prevailing military wisdom. The last standard infantry regiment formed in Arkansas during the war was the 39th Arkansas Infantry Regiment, formed in 1862.  After 1862 all new organizations were mounted infantry.

List of Cavalry Regiments
Cavalry regiments were organized from companies (also called, "troops") authorized at up to 100 men, ten companies made up a regiment. Two or more companies might be organized into a battalion (also called a "squadron").

List of Cavalry Battalions

Orphan Arkansas cavalry units listed on the National Park Service Soldiers and Sailor System

The Civil War Soldiers and Sailors System is a computerized database containing very basic facts about servicemen who served on both sides during the Civil War. The system contains names and other basic information from 6.3 million soldier records in the National Archives. The facts about the soldiers are indexed to many millions of other documents about Union and Confederate Civil War soldiers maintained by the National Archives and Records Administration. The information includes: histories of regiments in both the Union and Confederate Armies, links to descriptions of significant battles of the war, and other historical information.  The site currently includes regimental histories of units from 44 states and territories.  Joseph Crute's Units of the Confederate Army is the primary source for Confederate unit histories on the site.  Because the list of units was compiled over thirty years after the war, from very fragmentary records collected by the United States War Department, some units are misidentified, some being listed as regiments that may in fact have only been a company, such as Brandenburch's Arkansas Cavalry Regiment, which in fact was actually composed of one independent cavalry company surrendered at the battle of Arkansas Post.  Several Missouri units are misidentified as Arkansas Confederate units, such as "Coffee's Arkansas Cavalry Regiment", which is actually the 6th Missouri Cavalry.  The site contains several alleged Arkansas Confederate units for which no other information exists other than short list of names, probably developed from prisoner of war rosters.  Most of these units have less than six identified unit members.  Several have only one identified unit member.  The following units have no published history and may not have actually been Arkansas Confederate units:

Artillery
Most artillery units seem to have begun the war named for the city or county that sponsored its organization.  In the Official Records, artillery units are most often referred to by the name of their battery commander.  During the war, some effort was made to organize artillery units into battalions and regiments, but the units almost never functioned above the battery level, and were often broken out and fought as single gun sections. For these reasons the Arkansas artillery organizations are listed by several names.  The Arkansas batteries which served primarily in the Confederate Army of Tennessee or Army of Mississippi, (east of the Mississippi River) were "officially" designated as "_st Arkansas Light Artillery". On November 19, 1864, General E. Kirby Smith, commanding the Confederate Trans-Mississippi Department, issued Special Orders No. 290, organizing the artillery of the department into battalions, and listing the various batteries as "_st Arkansas Field Battery".  The component batteries rarely, if ever, operated together.  They were usually assigned individually to an infantry or cavalry brigade.

Arkansas soldiers in Confederate units of other States
In addition to serving in Confederate units organized in Arkansas, many Arkansas soldiers would serve in Confederate units organized by other states. Because Missouri Confederate troops were effectively driven out of the geographic area of Missouri after the Pea Ridge Campaign, except during raids by Generals Marmaduke, Shelby and Price, many of the Missouri units recruited heavily in Arkansas.  This practice led some Missouri units to be mislabeled as Arkansas Units, and some Arkansas units being mislabeled as Missouri units. Troops living near the borders with other states often enlisted in the nearest unit, even if across the state line, resulting in Arkansas soldiers enlisting in units from Missouri, Louisiana and Tennessee. Some Arkansas soldiers were also detailed to help bring Texas units up to strength. The following is a list of units from other Confederate States that contained large numbers of Arkansas soldiers:

Home Guard

The Arkansas Secession Convention enacted an ordinance on May 30, 1861, authorizing the county courts in each county of the state to appoint a "home guard of minute-men" for a term of service of three months, to include at least ten men in each township. The duty of the home guards was "to see that all slaves are disarmed, to prevent the assemblage of slaves in unusual numbers, to keep the slave population in proper subjugation, and to see that peace and order are observed."

The main reason for the creation of the home guard was to control the excesses of so-called "Vigilance Committees" which had been organized in various parts of the State from about 1859 to 1861 in response to hysterical (and unfounded) rumors of nefarious abolitionist plots and secret underground organizations. There are many lurid stories of assaults and murders attributed to these vigilantes. The home guard was intended to provide a military-style, regulated, accountable organization to keep an eye on the slave population and the activities of suspected abolitionists and Union sympathizers. An ancillary duty of the home guard was to support the Army of Arkansas when called upon to do so.

The records of some of the 1861 home guard companies can be found in County Court records. Unfortunately, the looting and destruction of county court-houses in many parts of the State during the war resulted in the loss of most of the records. The records that still exist consist mainly of lists of appointments (or election in some cases) of home guard members, as well as officer lists.

The term "home guard" was, and continues to be, misused and misunderstood. Legally, the term is not synonymous with "militia," though the two terms were often loosely used interchangeably. Additionally, there is a clear, but not generally understood, distinction between the home guard of 1861 and the home guard of the latter part of the war. The 1861 home guard was strictly an Arkansas show, a creation of the Secession Convention. A new generation of home guards came on line in Arkansas in 1863, pursuant to an Act of the Congress of the Confederate States adopted on October 13, 1862. Alternately referred to as "home guard" or 
"local defense" companies, these organizations were less concerned with civil order than with military duties. They functioned as a sort of military reserve, military police, and scouts. One of their less popular duties was the enforcement of the Conscription Law. An 1863 letter mentions the Drew County Home Guard using hounds to run down "draft-dodgers".

The later home guards were normally enlisted for a period of twelve months, and were subject to the orders of the governor. As a matter of interest, here is the oath sworn to by the Ashley County Home Guard when they were enlisted on November 4, 1863, at Hamburg. The following was transcribed from the original manuscript held by the Arkansas History Commission, with the original spelling and punctuation intact:

See also
Lists of American Civil War Regiments by State
Confederate Units by State
Arkansas in the American Civil War

References

External links
 Edward G. Gerdes Civil War Home Page
The Encyclopedia of Arkansas History and Culture
The War of the Rebellion: a Compilation of the Official Records of the Union and Confederate Armies
The Arkansas History Commission, State Archives, Civil War in Arkansas
 Hempstead, Fay, "A Pictorial History of Arkansas" St. Louis and New York, N. D. Thompson publishing company, 1890, Call number: 9197481,
 Col. John M. Harrell, "Confederate Military History, a library of Confederate States", Military History: Volume 10.2, Arkansas Clement Anselm Evans, Ed.,

 
Arkansas
Civil War